Old Dock is a maritime dock in the Port of Garston on the River Mersey at Garston, Liverpool, England. It accessed from Stalbridge Dock and provides access to North Dock.  Garston Dock was originally set up by the St Helen's Canal & Railway Company in June 1853.

External links
 https://web.archive.org/web/20051119104917/http://www.mersey-gateway.org/server.php?show=ConNarrative.37&chapterId=189
 MultiMap photo

Garston docks
Mersey docks